Cyphophoenix is a genus of flowering plant in the family Arecaceae. It contains 4 known species, all endemic to New Caledonia. The relationships between Cyphophoenix and some other genera of the tribe Basseliniinae including Physokentia and the New Caledonia endemic Burretiokentia are not clear.

List of species 

 Cyphophoenix alba (H.E.Moore) Pintaud & W.J.Baker, Kew Bull. 63: 67 (2008). 
 Cyphophoenix elegans (Brongn. & Gris) H.Wendl. ex Salomon, Palmen: 86 (1887). 
 Cyphophoenix fulcita (Brongn.) Hook.f. ex Salomon, Palmen: 86 (1887). 
 Cyphophoenix nucele H.E.Moore, Gentes Herb. 11: 165 (1976).

References 

 
Arecaceae genera
Endemic flora of New Caledonia
Taxonomy articles created by Polbot
Taxa named by Joseph Dalton Hooker